Favio Leandro Orsi (born 18 February 1974) is an Argentine football manager and former player who played mainly as a midfielder.

Career
Born in Pilar, Buenos Aires, Orsi played youth football for River Plate and Platense, also featuring with the first team of the latter. He also represented Estudiantes de Buenos Aires in his home country before moving to Finland in 1997 with FC Jazz, where he featured in nine Veikkausliiga matches.

Orsi retired in 2000, after struggling for two years with a knee injury while playing for an Italian club, but returned to action for a brief period in 2010 with Pilar FC. In the following year, he moved to a managerial role, taking over the latter side.

In 2012, Orsi moved to Fénix to join the coaching staff of Oscar Santángelo, and met Sergio Gómez (who was also a part of the staff). In April 2013, after Santángelo resigned, both Orsi and Gómez were named managers.

In June 2014, Orsi and Gómez were appointed in charge of Deportivo Español. The duo moved to Flandria in August 2015, and led the side to a first-ever promotion to the Primera B Nacional in their first season in charge, after winning the Primera B Metropolitana.

On 2 May 2018, after Flandria's relegation, both Orsi and Gómez left the side, and the duo took over Almagro on 5 June. They resigned the following 24 February, and both were named in charge of San Martín de Tucumán on 8 May 2019.

Dismissed by San Martín on 6 April 2021, Orsi and Gómez were named in charge of Ferro Carril Oeste on 20 July. Both resigned from the latter side on 20 December.

On 10 April 2022, Orsi and Gómez were appointed managers of Primera División side Godoy Cruz, in the place of Diego Flores. The duo left on a mutual agreement on 28 October.

Honours

Manager
Flandria
Primera B Metropolitana: 2016

References

External links

1974 births
Living people
Sportspeople from Buenos Aires Province
Argentine footballers
Association football midfielders
Veikkausliiga players
Club Atlético Platense footballers
Estudiantes de Buenos Aires footballers
FC Jazz players
Argentine expatriate footballers
Argentine expatriate sportspeople in Finland
Expatriate footballers in Finland
Argentine football managers
Primera B Nacional managers
Deportivo Español managers
Almagro managers
San Martín de Tucumán managers
Ferro Carril Oeste managers
Godoy Cruz Antonio Tomba managers